Yersinia rochesterensis is a Gram-negative, motile, rod-shaped bacterium that forms circular colonies and was isolated from human feces. This potentially pathogenic species has been isolated in human stools in France and in the United States where it was characterized at the Mayo Clinic. A Y. rochesterensis strain, isolated from hare and initially identified as Yersinia kristensenii, was serotyped as O:12,25.

References

External links
LSPN lpsn.dsmz.de
Type strain of Yersinia rochesterensis at BacDive -  the Bacterial Diversity Metadatabase

rochesterensis
Bacteria described in 2021